MMX is a live CD and DVD released by UK neo-progressive band Twelfth Night in 2010. It is the band's first newly recorded album since 1986.

Track listing
All songs written by Twelfth Night.

Disc One
The Ceiling Speaks
Kings & Queens
We Are Sane
Last Song
Für Helene I
First New Day
The Craft
Take a Look

Disc Two
Creepshow
This City
World Without End
Blondon Fair
Fact and Fiction
CRAB
The Poet Sniffs a Flower
The Collector
Love Song
Theatre

Personnel
Dean Baker - keyboards
Brian Devoil – drums, percussion 
Roy Keyworth - guitar, backing vocals
Clive Mitten – guitars, basses, bass pedals, keyboards, voice
Andy Sears – lead vocals, percussion, piano
Mark Spencer - guitars, basses, keyboards, vocals

Twelfth Night (band) albums
2010 live albums